Cavok Air or Cavok Airlines is a Ukrainian cargo airline based in Kyiv.

History
The airline was established in 2011 and started operations on 26 April 2012, following the receipt of an air operator's certificate from the State Aviation Administration of Ukraine.

Fleet

The Cavok Air fleet includes the following aircraft as of May 2022:

Accidents and incidents
 On 29 July 2017, Antonov An-74TK100 UR-CKC  crashed on take-off from São Tomé International Airport and was damaged beyond repair. A birdstrike was reported and the aircraft overran the end of the runway whilst attempting to abort the take-off.

References

External links 

 

Airlines of Ukraine
Cargo airlines of Ukraine
Airlines established in 2011
Ukrainian companies established in 2011